"Poor Willie" is the first single recorded commercially by The Parliaments. The single was released in 1959 by APT Records (APT 45-25036), a subsidiary of ABC-Paramount Records. Both songs were written by all of the Parliaments, which by this time consisted of George Clinton, Grady Thomas, Robert Lambert, and Charles Davis. The B-side of the single was entitled "Party Boys".

The record was not a hit, but it has become a collector's item, fetching hundreds of dollars at record conventions and on eBay.

References

The Parliaments songs
1958 songs
Songs written by George Clinton (funk musician)